3640 Gostin, provisional designation , is a stony Florian asteroid from the inner regions of the asteroid belt, approximately  in diameter. It was discovered on 11 October 1985, by American astronomer couple Carolyn and Eugene Shoemaker at the Palomar Observatory in California. The S-type asteroid has a rotation period of 3.26 hours. It was named for Australian geologist Victor Gostin.

Orbit and classification 

Gostin is a member of the Gondolatsch-cluster within the Flora family, a giant asteroid family and the largest family of stony asteroids in the main-belt,

It orbits the Sun in the inner main-belt at a distance of 2.0–2.4 AU once every 3 years and 4 months (1,212 days; semi-major axis of 2.22 AU). Its orbit has an eccentricity of 0.09 and an inclination of 4° with respect to the ecliptic.

Physical characteristics 

In the SMASS classification, Gostin is a common, stony S-type asteroid.

Rotation period 

In March 2010, a rotational lightcurve of Gostin was obtained from photometric observations at the Oakley Southern Sky Observatory. Lightcurve analysis gave a well-defined rotation period of 3.2641 hours with a brightness variation of 0.40 magnitude. Concurring lightcurves were also obtained at the Palomar Transient Factory and at the Etscorn Campus Observatory.

Diameter and albedo 

According to the survey carried out by the NEOWISE mission of NASA's Wide-field Infrared Survey Explorer, Gostin measures 7.148 and 7.613 kilometers in diameter and its surface has an albedo of 0.239 and 0.2127, respectively. The Collaborative Asteroid Lightcurve Link assumes an albedo of 0.24 – derived from 8 Flora, the parent body of the Flora family – and calculates a diameter of 8.58 kilometers based on an absolute magnitude of 12.5.

Naming 

This minor planet was named by the discoverers after Australian geologist Victor Gostin (born 1940) of the University of Adelaide, who in the 1980s discovered the ejecta layer from the Acraman bolide impact at a distance of 300 kilometers from the impact site, within Ediacaran sedimentary rocks of the Flinders Ranges, South Australia, which enabled the impact to be dated at ~580 Ma. The official naming citation was published by the Minor Planet Center on 2 February 1988.

References

External links 
 Asteroid Lightcurve Database (LCDB), query form (info )
 Dictionary of Minor Planet Names, Google books
 Discovery Circumstances: Numbered Minor Planets (1)-(5000) – Minor Planet Center
 
 

003640
Discoveries by Carolyn S. Shoemaker
Discoveries by Eugene Merle Shoemaker
Named minor planets
003640
19851011